is a railway station in Minato, Tokyo, Japan. The station is operated by the East Japan Railway Company (JR East).

The station is also accessible by the Toei Asakusa Line and the Keikyu Line via the nearby Sengakuji Station.

Naming
During the public naming campaign conducted by JR East in June 2018, the following names were suggested for the station (in alphabetical order):
Higashi-Sengakuji Station (東泉岳寺駅) – the station is east of Sengakuji Station
JR Sengakuji Station (JR泉岳寺駅) – to distinguish it from the existing station of the same name on Toei Asakusa Line
Kōnan Station (港南駅) – the station is located in the Kōnan district, southern Minato ward
Kōnan-Takanawa Station (港南高輪駅)
Minami-Minato/Nankō Station (南港駅)
Minami-Kōnan Station (南港南駅)
Nishi-Kōnan Station (西港南駅)
Nishi-Shibaura Station (西芝浦駅)
Olympics 2020 Station (オリンピック2020駅)
Shibaura Station (芝浦駅) – the Shibaura district is north of Kōnan
Shin-Kita-Shinagawa Station (新北品川駅) – the new station is north of Shinagawa Station
Shin-Shinagawa Station (新品川駅)
Takanawa Station (高輪駅) – the Takanawa district is located west of Kōnan
Takanawa Ōkido Station (高輪大木戸駅) – Takanawa Ōkido is a historical relic located next to Sengakuji Station

The results of the campaign concluded with the three top choices: Takanawa (8,398 votes), Shibaura (4,265 votes) and Shibahama (3,497 votes). However, Takanawa Gateway Station (高輪ゲートウェイ駅) was selected as the official name of the station despite receiving an exceedingly low number of votes, placing 130th overall in popularity among all submissions with 36 votes. Yuji Fukasawa, president of JR East, has justified the naming with Takanawa's historical status of being a "gateway to Edo", while also serving as the site for the development of an international hub in the future. This choice has spurred criticism from several members of the public, citing the decision being made with a lack of consideration to the public's wishes. According to a poll conducted by the Japanese website j-town.net, 95.8% of respondents disapproved of the name "Takanawa Gateway", while a Change.org petition calling for a name change had gathered over 9,500 signatures as of 9 December 2018.

Lines
The station is served by the Yamanote Line, which circles around central Tokyo, and the Keihin-Tōhoku Line, which runs from Saitama through Tokyo to Yokohama. Formally, the station lies on the Tokaido Main Line. The station is within the Yamanote Line fare zone (東京山手線内), and the Tokyo Metropolitan District fare zone (東京都区内).

Station layout

The station has two island platforms, serving the two lines stopping there. Above platform level, there will be an event space overlooking the platforms, with shopping and dining facilities inside the station.

The station was designed by Kengo Kuma.

Platforms
Takanawa Gateway Station has 4 tracks and 2 island platforms. Each platform equipped 3 escalators, 1 24-person elevator and 1 18-person elevator to the paid area of the concourse on the second floor.

Surrounding area
13 hectares of area in the Tamachi Depot will be repurposed and redeveloped, for an estimated cost of 500 billion Japanese yen. The Yamanote and Keihin-Tōhoku Line tracks will be moved east by 120 meters, such that office buildings, hotels, commercial buildings and high-rise skyscrapers can be built around the area, which is scheduled to open in 2024. JR East and the Urban Renaissance Agency are cooperating in this project.

History
The station was planned to open in 2020, to meet with the Tokyo Olympics and Paralympics and is the newest station to be built since Nishi-Nippori Station (opened in 1971) for the Yamanote Line, and Saitama-Shintoshin Station (opened in 2000) for the Keihin-Tōhoku Line.

On 6 September 2016, JR East announced the outline of this station and it was positioned as the core facility of Shinagawa Development Project "Global Gateway Shinagawa".

On 10 February 2017, construction on the station began.

From 5 to 30 June 2018, JR East publicly invited citizens to submit ideas of names for the new station, via mail or online submission. They announced that the finalized name of the station would be announced during winter 2018, while on 4 December 2018, the name was announced to be "Takanawa Gateway".

The Yamanote and Keihin-Tōhoku Lines between Shinagawa and Tamachi were rerouted via the new station on 16 November 2019 during construction that suspended train service on the lines from the early morning until around 4:00 PM.

The station opened on 14 March 2020, ten days before the summer Olympics were postponed to 2021 as a result of the COVID-19 pandemic. However, it is believed that the shopping and dining facilities inside will not be fully completed until 2024.

See also

 List of railway stations in Japan
 Sengakuji Station, a nearby Toei Asakusa Line station, where accompanying construction works are undergoing to extend the station platforms by 5 meters, in order to cope with the increasing ridership brought by this station.
Takanawa Great Wooden Gate

References

External links

Keihin-Tōhoku Line
Yamanote Line
Railway stations in Japan opened in 2020
Kengo Kuma buildings
Buildings and structures in Minato, Tokyo